Weekly Economic Times is a weekly newspaper of Bangladesh, is led by Shaukat Mahmood. It was founded by  Editor/Publisher Munirul Haq in 1995. Now published in 8-pages, Weekly Economic Times has its front-page and the last page printed in color and the other pages in black and white. Headquartered in Kakaril, Dhaka,

The Economic Times has its offices in Kawran Bazar and Kakrail, Dhaka. The publication has several segments of presentation,

 Home
 Front Page
 Politics
 Brand Jatra
 Banking & Finance
 Business & Finance
 Editorial Comments
 View Opinion
 Energy Power Auto
 Eduloid
 Travel & Aviation
 Tech Parley
 Back Page

Editor
Shaukat Mahmood, a leading senior journalist, is the editor of Weekly Economic Times. He is 'the president of the National Press Club, was elected to the position.

References

External links
 Weekly Economic Times Editorial Comments
 ET website

English-language newspapers published in Bangladesh
1995 establishments in Bangladesh
Newspapers published in Dhaka
Weekly newspapers published in Bangladesh